Dalwood is a village and civil parish in Devon, England. Dalwood may also refer to:

People
Dalwood (surname)

Places
Australia
Dalwood, New South Wales (Ballina Shire)
Dalwood, New South Wales (Singleton Council)

Other
Dalwood House, heritage-listed homestead and house museum in Branxton, New South Wales, Australia